Abu Abdallah Ja'far ibn Abd al-Wahid ibn Ja'far ibn Sulayman ibn Ali al-Hashimi (died 871/2?) was a Chief judge of the Abbasid Caliphate, from 854 to 863/4.

He was a minor member of the Abbasid dynasty, being a descendant of Sulayman ibn Ali, the uncle of the caliphs al-Saffah and al-Mansur. Although his jurisdictional background is obscure, he was appointed as chief judge (qadi al-qudat) by al-Mutawakkil in July 854 as a replacement for Yahya ibn Aktham. His tenure in office is notable for his participation in the Arab–Byzantine prisoner exchange of 856, during which al-Hasan ibn Muhammad ibn Abi al-Shawarib acted as his deputy in Samarra. He remained in office until 863 or 864, when he was dismissed and exiled to Basra after the general Wasif al-Turki accused him of engaging with the shakiriyya troops in a suspicious manner. He was eventually allowed to return to the capital, where in 866 he unsuccessfully attempted to settle a violent dispute between the Turkish and Maghariba army regiments. In 870 he led the prayers at the funeral of the caliph al-Muhtadi. He died in 871/2, or in 881/2 or 882/3 according to alternative accounts.

See also
 Al-Ḫaṣṣāf

Notes

References
 
 
 
 
 
 
 
 

9th-century people from the Abbasid Caliphate
Abbasids
9th-century deaths
Abbasid people of the Arab–Byzantine wars
Chief qadis of the Abbasid Caliphate
9th-century Arabs